Carr Hill High School is an 11–16, mixed comprehensive school in Kirkham, Lancashire, England. The school has 1,166 pupils currently enrolled. It has a learning library centre including a library area, an IT suite and a conference room, collectively known as 'The Hub'. There is an English Language and R.E block as well as Cookery, D.T, Performing Arts, maths block and P.E blocks. The school also has a Sports Dome, Dance Studio and Fitness Suite.

School history
The school was opened to the first pupils for the autumn term in 1957 and later officially opened by the Duchess of Kent in 1958.

The first headmaster was a Mr R. Simpson. At this time the school had four academic years as pupils would leave after their 14th birthday. A fifth year was added in 1961 for 'A' stream pupils to take their 'O' level GCE exams. The school was split into four 'houses'; Parker, Langton, Birley and Shaw, these names were based on local prominent families. The houses formed the foundation for competition in both academic and sporting areas. Carr Hill is the second Fylde school to remove its sixth form.

References

External links
School website

Secondary schools in Lancashire
Schools in the Borough of Fylde
Community schools in Lancashire